I. C. Balakrishnan is a member of 13th Kerala Legislative Assembly. He was elected from Sulthan Bathery constituency, representing Indian National Congress party.

Political life

He started his political life as a leader of KSU, while studying in GHSS Valad. He was the member of Thavinjal Grama Panchayat and Wayanad district Panchayat. He was the District President of Indian Youth Congress Wayanad. Now, he is the district president of Youth Congress, Wayanad.

He stood in the 2016 election against CPIM candidate E.A .Sankaran and won the seat with a margin of 7,583 votes.

Personal life
He was born in 1975 at Valad as the son of Chandu and Meenakshi. He is married to Lakshmi and has three daughters.

References

Indian National Congress politicians from Kerala
1975 births
Living people
Kerala MLAs 2016–2021
Kerala MLAs 2011–2016